Still Up in This Shit! (also spelled Still Up in This S#*+) is the seventh studio album by American rapper Frost. It was released on April 23, 2002 via Hit A Lick Records and Koch Entertainment. The album peaked at #183 on the Billboard 200, at #30 on the Top R&B/Hip-Hop Albums chart, and #12 on the Independent Albums chart. It spawned two singles: "Put in Work" featuring Daz Dillinger, and "Everybody Knows", but both of them weren't charted.

Track listing

Chart history

References

External links
 Still Up In This $#*+! at Discogs

2002 albums
Frost (rapper) albums
Albums produced by Fredwreck
Albums produced by Battlecat (producer)
Gangsta rap albums by American artists